The 1990 NCAA Division I-AA football season, part of college football in the United States organized by the National Collegiate Athletic Association at the Division I-AA level, began in August 1990, and concluded with the 1990 NCAA Division I-AA Football Championship Game on December 15, 1990, at Paulson Stadium in Statesboro, Georgia. The Georgia Southern Eagles won their fourth I-AA championship, defeating the Nevada Wolf Pack by a score of 36–13.

Notable changes
The Colonial League changed its name to the Patriot League, which it retains today, after it began to sponsor non-football sports.

Conference changes

Conference standings

Conference champions

Postseason
The top four teams were seeded, and thus assured of home games in the opening round. The location of the final, the Georgia Southern Eagles' Paulson Stadium, had been predetermined via a three-year agreement the university reached with the NCAA in February 1989.

NCAA Division I-AA playoff bracket
{{16TeamBracket-NoSeeds
| RD1=First RoundNovember 24Campus sites
| RD2=QuarterfinalsDecember 1Campus sites
| RD3=SemifinalsDecember 8Campus sites
| RD4=National Championship Game December 15Paulson StadiumStatesboro, GA
|group1=
|group2=
|group3=
|subgroup1=
|subgroup2=
|subgroup3=
|subgroup4=
|team-width=
|score-width=

|RD1-team01=
|RD1-score01=7
|RD1-team02=(1) *
|RD1-score02=28

|RD1-team03=
|RD1-score03=3
|RD1-team04=Boise State*
|RD1-score04=20

|RD1-team05=Northeast Louisiana
|RD1-score05=14
|RD1-team06=(4) Nevada*
|RD1-score06=27

|RD1-team07=Furman
|RD1-score07=45
|RD1-team08=*
|RD1-score08=17

|RD1-team09=UCF
|RD1-score09=20
|RD1-team10=(2) Youngstown State*
|RD1-score10=17

|RD1-team11=UMass
|RD1-score11=0
|RD1-team12=William & Mary*
|RD1-score12=38

|RD1-team13=The Citadel
|RD1-score13=0
|RD1-team14=(3) Georgia Southern*
|RD1-score14=31

|RD1-team15=Idaho
|RD1-score15=41
|RD1-team16=*
|RD1-score16=35

|RD2-team01=(1) Middle Tennessee State
|RD2-score01=13
|RD2-team02=Boise State*
|RD2-score02=20

|RD2-team03=(4) Nevada*
|RD2-score03=42***
|RD2-team04=Furman
|RD2-score04=35

|RD2-team05=UCF*
|RD2-score05=52
|RD2-team06=William & Mary
|RD2-score06=38

|RD2-team07=(3) Georgia Southern*
|RD2-score07=28
|RD2-team08=Idaho
|RD2-score08=27

|RD3-team01=Boise State
|RD3-score01=52
|RD3-team02=(4) Nevada*
|RD3-score02=59***

|RD3-team03=UCF
|RD3-score03=7
|RD3-team04=(3) Georgia Southern*
|RD3-score04=44

|RD4-team01=(4) Nevada
|RD4-score01=13
|RD4-team02=(3) Georgia Southern
|RD4-score02=36'}}
* By team name denotes host institution* By score denotes overtime periods''

Source:

References